Sayeh may refer to:
 Hushang Ebtehaj, Iranian poet